Eusphecia pimplaeformis is a moth of the family Sesiidae. It is found in Bulgaria, the Republic of Macedonia and Greece, as well as Turkey, Iran, the Caucasus and Iraq.

The larvae feed on Populus alba and sometimes Salix species. They mine the trunks of their host plant.

References

External links

Lepiforum.de

Moths described in 1872
Sesiidae
Moths of Europe
Moths of Asia
Taxa named by Charles Oberthür